Frappuccino is a line of blended iced coffee drinks sold by Starbucks. It consists of coffee or crème base, blended with ice and ingredients such as flavored syrups and usually topped with whipped cream and or spices. Frappuccinos are also sold as bottled coffee beverages in grocery stores, convenience stores and from vending machines.

History
Frappuccino is a portmanteau of "frappe" (pronounced  and spelled without the accent)—the New England name for a thick milkshake with ice cream, derived from the French word —and cappuccino, an espresso coffee with frothed milk.

The Frappuccino was originally developed, named, trademarked and sold by George Howell's Eastern Massachusetts coffee shop chain the Coffee Connection, and created by then-employee Andrew Frank. When Starbucks purchased the Coffee Connection in 1994, they gained the rights to use, make, market, and sell the Frappuccino drink. The drink, with a different recipe, was introduced under the Starbucks name in 1995. In 2012, Starbucks had annual Frappuccino sales of over $2 billion.

Recipe 
The recipe is derived from a fusion of various cold drinks, including the "coffee frap" (similar to iced coffee) and the "frappe" (blended ice cream, syrup, and milk), with the Italian cappuccino. The recipe today consists of an instant coffee mix, ice, an emulsifying agent such as xanthan gum, and other additives such as milk, sugar, flavored syrups, and whipped cream.

Versions

Currently available
The following is a list of the typical versions available of each type of Frappuccino.

Decaffeinated
Upon consumer request, decaf espresso can be used in place of the standard instant coffee mix.

Crème
A coffee-free base was created to make a drink called a Frappuccino Blended Crème. Menu examples include the Mocha Crème, Vanilla Bean Crème, Strawberry Crème, Matcha Crème, and Chai Crème. All Frappuccino menu items can come as a Crème based Frappuccino, occasionally under slighlty different names such as the Chocolate Cookie Crumble instead of the Mocha Cookie Crumble. Any syrup or sauce can be used to make a custom Frappuccino Blended Crème. Crème Frappuccinos contain very little or no caffeine.

Non-dairy alternatives
Frappuccinos made with soy milk became available in stores in the United States and Canada in 2010. In January 2011 Starbucks introduced this option to Australian stores, and the option has since been made available in other countries. Starbucks has also introduced coconut, almond and oat milk options.

Modifications
Frappuccinos may include additional ingredients, which can include espresso shots, flavored syrups, "Frappuccino chips" which are similar to chocolate chips, and flavored powders. Consumers may also customize the consistency of Frappuccinos by ordering light or extra ice. Any Frappuccino can have additional syrups, shots of espresso, or various other modifications at a possible surcharge.

Former

Juice blends
In the summer of 2006, Starbucks introduced the Frappuccino Juice Blend, which were described as being "real fruit juices combined with Tazo Tea, blended with ice". Juice Blends were gradually discontinued throughout 2007 and 2008 and are no longer offered by Starbucks.

Frappuccino Light
Previously, Frappuccinos were orderable as "light". Frappuccino light was an alternative to the coffee frappuccino, which was made using low in sugar frappuccino base, nonfat milk and standardly served without whipped cream. The light Frappuccino has now been discontinued.

Seasonal Limited Editions
Drinks such as the Unicorn, Frankenstein, and Zombie Frappuccinos were all seasonal limited editions. These Frappuccinos originally began releasing in April 2017, and ran through 2018, and only ran for a short period of time each, as the ingredients were produced in relatively low quantities.

Unicorn Frappuccino

Bottled Frappuccino
A bottled Frappuccino is sold in retail stores and vending machines. The U.S. 9.5-oz. bottled version was originally manufactured in 1996. Starbucks offers 19 different bottled Frappuccino flavors including Mocha, Vanilla, Coffee, Toasted White Chocolate Mocha, Pumpkin Spice, Caramel, and more. The bottled Frappuccino comes in two package sizes including 13.7 fl oz and 9.5 fl oz.

North American Coffee Partnership
In 1994, PepsiCo and Starbucks formed an entity called the North American Coffee Partnership. The joint venture was created so that ready-to-drink products using the Starbucks name could be distributed using Pepsi's global network. The Frappuccino was the joint venture's first product.

See also

 The Coffee Connection
 Coffee milk

References

External links

 

Products introduced in 1995
Frozen drinks
Starbucks
Coffee drinks